The Série 1550 are a series of 19 diesel-electric locomotives built for the Portuguese Railways (CP). They entered service in 1973; they were built in Canada by the Montreal Locomotive Works (MLW). The locomotives are MLW's type MX 620 design.

See also
List of MLW diesel locomotives

References 

Railway locomotives introduced in 1973
MLW locomotives
Diesel-electric locomotives of Portugal